Woo Eun-joung is a South Korean taekwondo practitioner. 

She won a gold medal in middleweight at the 1997 World Taekwondo Championships in Hong Kong, by defeating Ireane Ruíz in the semifinal, and Mounia Bourguigue in the final.

References

External links

Year of birth missing (living people)
Living people
South Korean female taekwondo practitioners
World Taekwondo Championships medalists
21st-century South Korean women